Huagu Subdistrict is a subdistrict of Dongkou County in Hunan, China. It was one of three subdistricts established in July 2015. The subdistrict of Huagu  has 9 villages and a community under its jurisdiction.

History
The former Huagu Township was reorganized as a subdistrict in July 2015.

Subdivisions
The subdistrict of Huagu has a community and 9 villages under its jurisdiction.

a community
 Liyuan Community

9 villages
 Changlong Village()
 Chengnan Village()
 Huagu Village()
 Huishui Village()
 Jiangnan Village()
 Qili Village()
 Tianjia Village()
 Yuelong Village()
 Zhenglong Village()

References

Dongkou
Subdistricts of Hunan